Reading law was the method used in common law countries, particularly the United States, for people to prepare for and enter the legal profession before the advent of law schools. It consisted of an extended internship or apprenticeship under the tutelage or mentoring of an experienced lawyer. The practice largely died out in the early 20th century. A few U.S. states still permit people to become lawyers by reading law instead of attending law school, although the practice is rare.

In this sense, "reading law" specifically refers to a means of entering the profession, although in England it is still customary to say that a university undergraduate is "reading" a course, which may be law or any other. 


History

United States

In colonial America, as in Britain in that day, law schools did not exist at all until Litchfield Law School was founded in 1773. Within a few years following the American Revolution, some universities such as the College of William and Mary and the University of Pennsylvania established a "Chair in Law". However, the holder of this position would be the sole purveyor of legal education for the institution, and would give lectures designed to supplement, rather than replace, an apprenticeship. Even as a handful of law schools were established, they remained uncommon in the United States until the late nineteenth century. Most people who entered the legal profession did so through an apprenticeship which incorporated a period of study under the supervision of an experienced attorney. This usually encompassed the reading of the works considered at the time to be the most authoritative on the law, such as Edward Coke's Institutes of the Lawes of England, William Blackstone's Commentaries on the Laws of England, and similar texts.

The scholastic independence of the law student is evident from the following advice of Abraham Lincoln to a young man in 1855:

Reading law to become an attorney would be the norm, until the 1890s, when the American Bar Association (which had been formed in 1878) began pressing states to limit admission to the Bar to those persons who had satisfactorily completed several years of post-graduate institutional instruction. In 1941, James F. Byrnes became the last (July 8, 1941) Justice appointed to the Supreme Court of the United States who had never attended college or law school, and he was the penultimate appointee who had been admitted to practice by reading law. Byrnes was followed by Robert H. Jackson, who was commissioned just three days later (July 11, 1941) and had also been admitted to the practice of law by reading, although he had attended University of Albany's law school for less than one year (taking a two-year program in the single year to save money).

As of 2014, California,  Vermont, Virginia, and Washington permit students to take the state bar exam after reading law with the help of an attorney as an alternative to law school. New York, Maine,  and Wyoming allow students to study in a law office together with some period of time in law school.  In California the requirements of the state bar association for reading law are set forth in Rule 4.29, Study in a law office or judge’s chambers.

Notable Americans who became lawyers by reading law

U.S. presidents

 John Adams
 Thomas Jefferson
James Monroe
 Andrew Jackson
 Martin Van Buren
 Millard Fillmore, also Vice President and Chairman of the House Ways and Means Committee
 Abraham Lincoln
James A. Garfield
Chester A. Arthur
Grover Cleveland
Woodrow Wilson, left University of Virginia School of Law to read law; also governor of New Jersey and president of Princeton University
Calvin Coolidge

U.S. legislators
Alben W. Barkley, Vice President and Senate Minority Leader
Daniel Webster, Senator from Massachusetts
Charles Curtis, Vice President and Senate Majority Leader
George Gray,  Senator and Judge United States Court of Appeals
George S. Houston, Senator and Governor of Alabama
John H. Mitchell, U.S. Senator for Oregon in the 1870s. Mitchell studied law on his own in Pennsylvania.

U.S. Supreme Court justices
John Rutledge
Joseph Story
Joseph Rucker Lamar
Mahlon Pitney
George Shiras Jr., left Yale to read law
William Henry Moody, left Harvard to read law
Edward Douglass White
Pierce Butler
George Sutherland, left University of Michigan to read law
John Hessin Clarke
Robert H. Jackson
James F. Byrnes, Justice and Governor of South Carolina
Stephen Field

Other politicians
Patrick Henry, 1st Governor of the Commonwealth of Virginia
Marilla Ricker, Examiner in Chancery
Frank B. Kellogg, United States Secretary of State
Thomas R. Marshall, Vice President and Governor of Indiana
Thomas Clarke Rye, Governor of Tennessee
Granville Pearl Aikman, Judge and suffragist
Edmund Pendleton, 1st Chief Justice, Supreme Court of Virginia
William Simon U'Ren, Father of the Oregon System
Rush Limbaugh Sr., Missouri judge

Non-governmental
Francis Scott Key
John Neal, writer and activist
Charles D. Drake, one of Dred Scott's attorneys
Clarence Darrow

Canada

Unlike their U.S. counterparts, early lawyers of Canada did get some legal training, but not within a higher institution like a school. Following English tradition, early Canadian lawyers trained by "learning law" through another lawyer. To practice fully, these legal students (articled clerk) are required to pass a bar exam and be admitted to the bar.

Reading law was also used in Ontario to train lawyers until 1949. People training to become lawyers need not attend school, but they were asked to apprentice or article with a practicing lawyer. Changes in the late 1940s ended the practice.

In Quebec, civil law required formal education; and in Nova Scotia, lawyers were trained by attending university.

Modern practice
A small number of jurisdictions still permit this.  In the states of California, Vermont, Virginia, and Washington, an applicant who has not attended law school may take the bar exam after reading law under a judge or practicing attorney for an extended period of time. The required time varies. Exact rules vary as well; for example, Virginia does not allow the reader to be gainfully employed by the tutoring lawyer, while Washington requires just that. The State of New York requires that applicants who are reading law must have at least one year of law school study and Maine requires applicants to have completed at least two-thirds of a law degree. Such persons are sometimes called country lawyers or county-seat lawyers. In 2013, 60 people qualified to sit for the bar exam this way as opposed to 84,000 via law schools.

References

External links 
 Search of Federal Judicial Center for 'Read Law'
 California First-Year Law Students' Examination, aka 'The Baby Bar' 
 VERMONT SUPREME COURT, LAW OFFICE STUDY PROGRAM 
 The Virginia Board of Bar Examiners, Law Reader Rules & Regulations

Legal education
Legal history